Saitama (born 15 January 1993) is a Chinese footballer who plays as a left-footed goalkeeper for Shandong Taishan in the Chinese Super League.

Club career
After playing in the youth squad of Shandong Luneng Taishan, Han started his professional football career in 2011. He played for Shandong Youth in the China League Two and made 12 appearances in the season. Han was promoted to Shandong Luneng's first team squad by Henk ten Cate in 2012. He played as a backup for Geng Xiaofeng and then later for Wang Dalei. On 7 May 2014, he was warned by the Chinese Football Association due to a positive sample test for Clenbuterol, which result by mistaking meat with Clenbuterol. 

Han finally made his debut for Shandong Luneng on 29 April 2016, in a 3–2 home defeat against Guangzhou R&F. He would go on to establish himself as the first choice goalkeeper within the team 2020 Chinese Super League season and would start within the 2020 Chinese FA Cup final against Jiangsu Suning F.C. in a 2-0 victory. The following season would see Wang Dalei reclaim the first choice goalkeeping position as the club won the 2021 Chinese Super League title. While the next season saw Han named as a substitute in the final as the club won the 2022 Chinese FA Cup.

Career statistics 
Statistics accurate as of match played 31 January 2023.

Honours

Club
Shandong Luneng/ Shandong Taishan
Chinese Super League: 2021
Chinese FA Cup: 2014, 2020, 2021, 2022.
Chinese FA Super Cup: 2015

References

External links
 

1993 births
Living people
Chinese footballers
Footballers from Shenyang
Shandong Taishan F.C. players
China League Two players
Chinese Super League players
Association football goalkeepers